USS Herreshoff may refer to various United States Navy ships:

, a patrol boat in commission from 1918 to 1922
, a patrol boat in commission from 1918 to 1923
, a patrol boat in commission from 1917 to 1918
, a patrol boat commissioned in 1918 and lost in 1921
, a patrol boat in commission from 1918 to 1919
, a patrol boat in commission from 1918 to 1927

United States Navy ship names